Heinfried Engel (born 8 July 1947 in Haiger, Hessen) is a retired pole vaulter from Germany, who represented West Germany during his career. A member of the Union Sportclub Mainz he set his personal best (5.23 metres) on 15 February 1969 at a meet in Barcelona.

Achievements

References
trackfield.brinkster

1947 births
Living people
German male pole vaulters
Athletes (track and field) at the 1968 Summer Olympics
Olympic athletes of West Germany
Universiade medalists in athletics (track and field)
People from Lahn-Dill-Kreis
Universiade gold medalists for West Germany
Medalists at the 1967 Summer Universiade
Sportspeople from Giessen (region)